Macrocoma heydeni is a species of leaf beetle of Morocco, described by Édouard Lefèvre in 1876.

References

heydeni
Beetles of North Africa
Beetles described in 1876
Taxa named by Édouard Lefèvre
Endemic fauna of Morocco